WOUF (750 AM) is a radio station licensed to Petoskey, Michigan, and owned by Suzanne Henderson through N Content Marketing.

History
The station began broadcasting in June 2000, holding the call sign WWKK, and aired an oldies format with programming from Westwood One. The station was branded "Kool 750". The station was owned by Stone Communications. In 2002, the station's weekday programming was changed to talk. The station retained the "Kool 750" branding. In 2007, Stone Communications exchanged the station for 1210 WLDR in Kingsley, Michigan, with Roy Henderson's Fort Bend Broadcasting taking ownership of 750 WWKK and a payment of $244,000 in cash. In April 2007, the station's format was changed to country music, simulcasting WLDR-FM. In May 2007, the station's call sign was changed to WLDR. In 2008, the station's call sign was changed to WARD, which was named after Roy Henderson's son. In 2014, WARD and its simulcast partner WLDR-FM adopted an adult contemporary format.

In mid-October 2019, WARD went silent (off the air). The call letters were changed to WOUF, previously used on two other Northern Michigan stations, on November 9, 2021.

References

External links

OUF (AM)
Radio stations established in 2000
2000 establishments in Michigan
Easy listening radio stations